The 2008 United States Senate election in Kentucky was held on November 4, 2008. Minority Leader and incumbent Republican U.S. Senator Mitch McConnell won re-election to a fifth term. Although Barack Obama lost Kentucky by a 16.22% margin to John McCain in the presidential election which occurred simultaneously, McConnell more narrowly kept his seat with a 5.94% margin against businessman Bruce Lunsford. This was a greatly reduced margin from when he won re-election in 2002 with a 29.4% margin.

Background 
In 2007 Kentucky's unpopular Republican Governor, Ernie Fletcher, lost his re-election bid.  The Democrats took control of both Houses of Congress in the 2006 mid-term elections and in October Chuck Schumer acknowledged they were aiming for McConnell's seat.

State auditor Crit Luallen was considered a top contender for the Democratic nomination, but she decided to remain as auditor. Lunsford was asked to run by Kentucky Governor Steve Beshear. Seven candidates competed for the Democratic Primary nomination. The primaries for both parties took place on May 20, 2008 in which Lunsford took more than 50%.

Republican primary

Candidates 
 Daniel Essek
 Mitch McConnell, incumbent U.S. Senator

Results

Democratic primary

Candidates 
 Michael Cassaro
 Greg Fischer, businessman
 Bruce Lunsford, former Kentucky Secretary of Commerce and candidate for Governor in 2003 and 2007
 James Rice
 Kenneth Stepp
 David Williams
 David Wylie

Results

General election

Candidates 
 Bruce Lunsford (D), businessman
 Mitch McConnell (R), incumbent U.S. Senator

Campaign 
In October Lunsford and McConnell were statistically tied in the polls. Larry Sabato, director of the University of Virginia Center for Politics, said "If Lunsford is actually doing this well, its got to be because the public is so upset by the economic meltdown and may be blaming the legislative leaders."

A debate scheduled for October 7 hosted by the League of Women Voters was canceled when incumbent McConnell decided not to participate even though Lunsford announced he wanted to debate.

On November 2, 2008, media outlets such as The Wall Street Journal noted that the website of The New Republic had reported that anti-McConnell flyers questioning the senator's sexuality as well as the reasons for his 1967 military discharge were being distributed in Kentucky.

Predictions

Polling

Results

Results breakdown

See also 
 2008 United States Senate elections

References

External links 
 Kentucky State Board of Elections
 U.S. Congress candidates for Kentucky at Project Vote Smart
  – CQ Politics
 Kentucky U.S. Senate from OurCampaigns.com
  – 2008 Race Tracker
  – OpenSecrets
  – graph of multiple polls from Pollster.com
 Official campaign websites
  – Democratic nominee
 Mitch McConnell for Senate – Republican nominee

2008
Kentucky
United States Senate